Mind Raft is the solo debut EP released by former Dirty Projectors member Deradoorian. Its sound has been contrasted starkly with that of the Projectors' music.

Critical reception

Mike Powell of Pitchfork gave Mind Raft a 5.8 out of 10, saying, "the songs wander and churn when it feels like they could develop, and ultimately, it's a record that I'll never mind having on but probably rarely reach for." Scott Tavener of Exclaim! described the EP as "an auspicious, if incomplete, introduction."

Track listing

References

External links
 

2009 debut EPs
Albums produced by David Longstreth